Birds of Prey is an American superhero television series that was developed by Laeta Kalogridis for The WB and is loosely based on the DC Comics series of the same name. The series takes place in a Gotham City abandoned by Batman. Despite the series debut garnering ratings of 7.6 million viewers (at the time, the network's largest premiere in the 18–34 demographic), the series was canceled after ratings fell sharply in subsequent weeks. Thirteen episodes were produced and aired in total.

The initial trailers for the series and its opening credits used footage of Michael Keaton (as Bruce Wayne / Batman) and Michelle Pfeiffer (as Selina Kyle / Catwoman) from Batman Returns, indicating that the series was to share a continuity with the Tim Burton Batman films.

Synopsis
The series is set in New Gotham City, several years after it has been apparently abandoned by Batman. In his absence, Oracle (Barbara Gordon) and the Huntress (Helena Kyle) have taken over his war on crime. The two are joined by Dinah Redmond, a telepath (after she assists them in defeating Larry Ketterly); Alfred Pennyworth, who serves Helena as she is heir to the Wayne estate; and Detective Jesse Reese, a police officer confronted with crimes and abilities he cannot explain.

A central feature of the series is the concept of metahumans: individuals born with powers that cannot be explained. No two metahumans have the same abilities (unless hereditary), and there exists a whole subculture of metahuman society that the outside world knows nothing about.

Detective Reese reluctantly teams up with Huntress and the other Birds of Prey to defeat metahuman criminals. At first, he disapproves of Helena's vigilantism, even trying to arrest her, but eventually he realizes there is a need for the Birds of Prey to take down criminals the police cannot handle.

During the course of the show, the Birds of Prey often confront schemes masterminded by Dr. Harleen Quinzel (Harley Quinn), though they are unaware of her involvement until the final episode of the series. Quinzel's attempts to discover what Helena is hiding, and the duplicitous nature of their therapy sessions together, form a large part of the series arc, beginning in the pilot episode and being resolved in the series finale.

Characters

Main

 Ashley Scott as Helena Kyle / Huntress  The daughter of Batman and Catwoman. She is half-metahuman, with cat-like abilities inherited from her mother (also a metahuman in the Birds of Prey continuity): enhanced agility, strength, healing and a sixth sense for danger, as well as the ability to shift her eyes to a feline form. This change is usually triggered by strong emotion, but can also be used to grant Helena enhanced night vision. She was raised by her mother without ever knowing who her father was until the night Catwoman was murdered in cold blood on the street, right in front of her by an unknown assassin hired by the Joker (eventually revealed to be Clayface). After this, she was taken in by Barbara Gordon, who raised and trained her.
 Dina Meyer as Barbara Gordon / Batgirl / Oracle  Originally one of Batman's apprentices and the daughter of his trusted ally Police Commissioner James Gordon, Barbara was shot by the Joker as revenge for Batman's dismantling of his criminal operation, leaving her paralyzed and forced to give up her life as Batgirl. To compensate, she renamed herself Oracle and began using her expertise in computer hacking and weaponry to fight crime. Oracle calls upon Huntress to handle the field work she is no longer capable of doing and maintains her superhero contacts. By day, Barbara is a teacher at New Gotham High, but, by night, she fights crime from a secret location in the New Gotham Clocktower. Despite being paraplegic, Barbara works at developing a cybernetic implant for her spine in the hope that one day she will regain her mobility. 
 Rachel Skarsten as Dinah Redmond (née Lance)  Also a metahuman, Dinah is drawn to New Gotham and to Helena and Barbara by visions of the tragedies that befell them on the night of the Joker's revenge. She proves herself to the two and is taken in as a member of their team, with the condition that she train in the use of her metahuman abilities. In addition to her precognitive dreams, Dinah is a touch-telepath, able to read the thoughts of anyone she comes in physical contact with and later manifests the power of telekinesis. During the course of the series, Dinah discovers that her mother is actually Carolyn Lance, the Black Canary, also a metahuman and legendary superhero, who gave Dinah up for her own safety when she was a child after she did not display any metahuman potential. Unbeknownst to Carolyn, Dinah's abilities manifested while in the care of her foster parents, who reacted with fear and physical abuse towards the young Dinah. This prompted her to run away where she was found by Barbara Gordon. The discovery of Dinah's relation to the Black Canary leads Oracle to believe that she may also have inherited her mother's hypersonic ability, although it is never demonstrated. Under Barbara and Helena's tutelage, Dinah becomes a skilled combatant.
 Shemar Moore as Detective Jesse Reese (né Hawke)  An honest police detective who encounters Huntress while investigating a rash of bizarre suicides, Jesse is simultaneously drawn to her and disapproves of her disrespect for the law. Nevertheless the two are thrown together by cases involving metahuman abilities. Reese's birthname was revealed as Jesse Hawke, and his father is Al Hawke, head of a powerful crime family and sworn enemy of Carolyn Lance, Dinah's mother. When he turned 16, after nearly being arrested when a police officer found traces of blood found all over the trunk of his father's car while he was driving it, Jesse's relationship with his father became estranged. He forsook the name "Hawke", took his mother's surname, and dedicated his life to find justice for his father's victims. He pursued a career in law enforcement to atone for his family's sins. Reese and Helena ultimately bond romantically towards the end of the series.
 Ian Abercrombie as Alfred Pennyworth  Faithful butler to the Wayne family, Alfred transferred his services to Helena and Barbara in Batman's absence, and is often present at the clock tower, taking care of their day-to-day needs. He shares a close bond with Barbara, often listening to her problems or giving her advice on personal situations, whether she wants to hear it or not. He secretly remains in contact with Batman, updating him on the status of the Birds, in particular, that of Helena.
 Mia Sara as Dr. Harleen Quinzel / Harley Quinn  A psychiatrist Helena is ordered to see after being convicted of vandalism while chasing a thief. Harley Quinn was Joker's lover and accomplice prior to his incarceration, unbeknownst to Helena and the other Birds of Prey, and has come to seek her revenge on New Gotham for what it did to her 'Mr J'. Though she presents herself as a respectable professional, once called upon by the authorities to work with violent and dangerous felons, Harleen Quinzel is herself insane, using her contacts with the criminal world to mastermind her revenge.

Recurring
 Shawn Christian as Wade Brixton  The guidance counselor at New Gotham High. He and Barbara meet in the pilot and subsequently begin a relationship.
 Robert Patrick Benedict as Gibson Kafka  A metahuman with perfect photographic memory. He can recall every taste, sight, sound and smell he has ever experienced (since before birth) and knows, to the second, the amount of time that has passed since he last saw someone. He is the proprietor of No Man's Land, a bar and safe house for metahumans. He first appears in the third episode, "Prey for the Hunter".
 Brent Sexton as Detective McNally  A New Gotham detective and partner of Jesse Reese. He is skeptical of all things strange and unexplainable. He first appears in the pilot.

Episodes

Media releases
Birds of Prey was released on Region 1 DVD on July 15, 2008. The four-disc collection includes the thirteen episodes that were broadcast plus the unaired pilot, which features Sherilyn Fenn as Harley Quinn, and all three seasons of the Flash-animated series Gotham Girls. The episodes are presented in letterboxed widescreen format.

Some music differs from the original televised version including the theme song ("My Remedy"), which in the original airing was "Revolution" by Aimee Allen, as well as additional songs such as "Harder to Breathe" by Maroon 5 in the second episode and the fight music "All the Things She Said" by t.A.T.u. in the final episode which was replaced with "Beautiful Freak" by Dirty Children.

Ashley Scott, Dina Meyer, and Rachel Skarsten were reunited on April 25, 2015 at Hollywood Show at the Westin Los Angeles Airport Hotel.

Arrowverse

Ashley Scott reprises her role as Helena Kyle for the Arrowverse crossover event "Crisis on Infinite Earths", which retroactively establishes the world of Birds of Prey as Earth-203 before the Anti-Monitor (played by LaMonica Garrett) destroys it.  Dina Meyer additionally reprises her role as Barbara Gordon, though only in an uncredited vocal capacity.

See also
 Birds of Prey (2020 film)

Note

References

External links
 Official DVD website
 

 
2002 American television series debuts
2003 American television series endings
American action television series
2000s American drama television series
2000s American science fiction television series
English-language television shows
Television shows based on DC Comics
Television shows set in the United States
Television series by Warner Bros. Television Studios
The WB original programming
Batman (1989 film series)
Vigilante television series
Superheroine television shows